St Thomas More College (STMC) is a Catholic, coeducational, secondary school located approximately 15 km south of Brisbane. It is a part of Brisbane Catholic Education.

History
St. Thomas More College, named after St. Thomas More, is a secondary school operated under the Brisbane Catholic Education system. The college was opened for the first time in January 1974, with an enrolment of 75 boys. The following year, the college made the move to become coeducational with an enrolment of 143 girls and 96 boys. Presentation Sisters were part of the staff until 1988.

The college adopted its name for the values that St. Thomas More stood for, more specifically, families and family values; scholarship and learning; justice and fairness; Christian principles and spirituality.

Programs and Services
St. Thomas More College provides a variety of service to its students, including music and arts, health and physical education and curricular classes, such as Mathematics, Science and English studies. The college also offers Information Technology classes, several branches of science in senior years (Biology, Physics, Multi-strand Science), Music classes (composing and writing music, analysing music) and private music lessons (percussion, strings, piano, voice), drama and acting, wood and metal working, textiles and designs, food technology, LOTE and finally, business and economics.

Music

The college offers music classes at no cost, but also offers one-on-one instrumental music lessons under a scholarship. Instrumental music lessons cover the following subjects:
 Music Theory
 Piano and Keyboard
 Voice and Singing
 Violin, Viola, Cello, Double Bass
 Saxophone, Clarinet, Flute
 Guitar, Electric and Acoustic
 Drums and Percussion
 Brass

Acting and Drama

St. Thomas More College offers its pupils private acting and speech lessons for a cost, much like instrumental music lessons, along with drama classes. The college has adopted a cyclical theatre production over each two year period. Generally, a Musical production is shown for the first year and both Junior (Years 7-10) and Senior (Years 11-12) productions in the second year.

Moodle

A moodle system is integrated into the college's daily running, with homework, assignments and courses being posted on the site. Moodle has been incorporated at the college since 2008, with the use ramping up in 2010 when laptops are distributed to some students. The college often plays hosts to other school's teachers, learning how to  use moodle as an effective learning tool.

Laptop Program

In early August 2010, loan-issued laptops were given to students in Year 9 as part of the Governments 1:1 laptop program. Since the funding for this program has finished the college has continued the program providing laptops to all grades. Quality Education series Dell laptops are provided with a suite of enterprise grade programs ready to go.

The chapel
Our Lady of Sacred Heart Catholic Church opened in Cooranga (then known as Cooranga North) on Sunday 11 September 1938 on land donated by Mrs Mary Gertrude O'Brien. It was at 152 Cooranga North Niagara Road. On 28 June 2017 in the middle of the night, the church building was relocated to St Thomas More College, where it is used as the school's chapel.

See also
 Brisbane Catholic Education
 Catholicism
 Secondary School

References 

Educational institutions established in 1974